Rheinischer Zuckerrübensirup is a PGI protected sugar-beet syrup.

References

German products with protected designation of origin